Jonathan T. Stone (born 1983 in Derby, England) is a British poet. He is the author of two books and three pamphlets of poetry, and the co-editor of numerous collaborative small press poetry anthologies published by Sidekick Books. His poems have been published in The Sunday Times, Poetry Review, Poetry London and The Rialto (poetry magazine), among others.

He graduated with a BA in English Literature and Creative Writing from the University of East Anglia in 2004. He won an Eric Gregory Award in 2012.

Awards
2012 Eric Gregory Award
2014 Poetry London Prize
2015 Hawthornden Castle Fellowship
2016 Poetry London Prize

Bibliography
 I'll Show You Tyrants (2005)
 Scarecrows (2010)
 School of Forgery (2012)
 Riotous (with Kirsten Irving) (2013)
 Tomboys (2016)

References

1983 births
Living people
Alumni of the University of East Anglia
British poets
British male poets